John H. Clark may refer to:

John Harrison Clark (c. 1860–1927), Cape Colony adventurer who ruled much of southern Zambia
John Heaviside Clark (died 1863), Scottish aquatint engraver and painter of seascapes and landscapes
John Howard Clark (died 1878), editor of The South Australian Register, 1870–1877
John Clark (boxer) (1849–1922), Irish-American boxer
John H. Clark House, a historic residence in Mechanicsburg, Ohio named for a local John H. Clark